The International Robot Exhibition (IREX) is the largest robot trade fair in the world. It is an event that has been staged once every two years in Tokyo, Japan since 1973 and is organized by the Japan Robot Association (JARA) and the company Nikkan Kogyo Shimbun, Ltd. It is a place for companies from Japan and around the world to exhibit the latest in robot technology.

Robots
These are some examples of the robots that have been displayed at previous exhibitions.
 Actroid
 Seiko Epson Micro flying robot
 TOPIO
 JO-ZERO

References

External links
 

Robotics events
Robotics in Japan
Trade fairs in Japan
Events in Tokyo
Recurring events established in 1973